Mannekind is an album by drummer Shelly Manne, recorded in 1972 and released on the Mainstream label.

Reception

The AllMusic review by Scott Yanow states: "Despite a few good solos, this is one of the weaker Shelly Manne albums".

Track listing
 Birth - 0:30
 "Scavenger" (Mike Wofford) - 9:36
 "Seance" (John Morell) - 7:55
 "Witch's" (Morell) - 4:15
 Fertility - 0:30
 Maturity - 0:27
 "Tomorrow" (Wofford) - 7:50
 "Pink Pearl" (Morell) - 2:45
 "Mask" (Wofford) - 7:27
 Infinity - 0:42

Personnel
Shelly Manne - drums, berimbau, waterphone, cuca, super balls on cymbals, dahka de bellos
John Morell - guitar
Mike Wofford - piano
John Gross - tenor saxophone
Gary Barone - trumpet
Jeffry Castleman - bass
Brian Moffet - percussion, assorted bells, wind chimes, hi-hat, maracas, tambourine, dahka de bellos

References

1972 albums
Mainstream Records albums
Shelly Manne albums
Albums produced by Bob Shad